is a railway station located in the city of Noshiro, Akita Prefecture, Japan, operated by the East Japan Railway Company (JR East).

Lines
Tomine Station is served by the Ōu Main Line, and is located 365.5 km from the terminus of the line at Fukushima Station.

Station layout
The station consists of two opposed side platforms connected to the station building by a footbridge. The station is unattended.

Platforms

History
Tomine Station was opened on January 25, 1907 as a station on the Japanese Government Railways (JGR), serving the village of Futatsui, Akita. The JGR became the Japan National Railways (JNR) after World War II. The station has been unattended since October 1971. The station was absorbed into the JR East network upon the privatization of the JNR on April 1, 1987.

Passenger statistics
In fiscal 2015, the station was used by an average of 97 passengers daily (boarding passengers only).

Surrounding area
 Tomine Post office

References

External links

 JR East Station information 

Railway stations in Japan opened in 1907
Railway stations in Akita Prefecture
Ōu Main Line
Noshiro, Akita